Manifold: Time is a 1999 science fiction novel by Stephen Baxter. It is the first of Baxter's Manifold Trilogy (the others being Manifold: Space and Manifold: Origin), although the books can be read in any order because the series takes place in a multiverse.

The book was nominated for the 2000 Arthur C. Clarke Award.

Plot summary
Time is set on Earth, the inner part of the Solar System and various other universes onwards from the 21st century. The novel covers a wide range of topics, including the Doomsday argument, Fermi paradox, genetic engineering, and humanity's extinction.

The book begins at the end of space and time, when the last descendants of humanity face an infinite but pointless existence.  Due to proton decay, the physical universe has collapsed, but some form of intelligence has survived by embedding itself into a lossless computing substrate where it can theoretically survive indefinitely.  However, because there will never be new input, eventually all possible thoughts will be exhausted.  Some portion of this intelligence decides that this should not have been the ultimate fate of the universe, and takes action to change the past, centering on the early 21st century.  The changes come in several forms, including a message to Reid Malenfant, the appearance of super-intelligent children around the world, and the discovery of a mysterious gateway on asteroid 3753 Cruithne.

Baxter's short story "Sheena 5" explores an alternate ending to the story of Sheena, the intelligent squid.

Characters
Reid Malenfant – protagonist
Emma Stoney – Malenfant's ex-wife and employee
Cornelius Taine – brilliant eschatologist mathematician
Sheena – a genetically engineered squid
Maura Della – concerned politician
Michael – a "Blue" child savant and guide to Reid
Dan Ystebo – marine scientist
Anna – oldest of the "Blue" savant children

Style
Time is split into four parts and then into smaller sections that each focus on a different character.

Release details
1999, UK, Voyager (HarperCollins) , Pub date 2 August 1999, hardback
2000, UK, Voyager (HarperCollins) , Pub date 7 August 2000, paperback
2000, USA, Del Rey Books , Pub date ? January 2000, hardback
2000, USA, Del Rey Books , Pub date ? November 2000, paperback

References

External links
 Manifold Time at Worlds Without End

1999 science fiction novels
1999 British novels
British science fiction novels
Novels about the end of the universe
Voyager Books books
Fiction about near-Earth asteroids
Novels by Stephen Baxter